Deneb is a first-magnitude star in the constellation of Cygnus, the swan. Deneb is one of the vertices of the asterism known as the Summer Triangle and the "head" of the Northern Cross. It is the brightest star in Cygnus and the 19th brightest star in the night sky, with an average apparent magnitude of +1.25. A blue-white supergiant, Deneb rivals Rigel as the most luminous first-magnitude star. However, its distance, and hence luminosity, is poorly known; its luminosity is somewhere between 55,000 and 196,000 times that of the Sun.  Its Bayer designation is α Cygni, which is Latinised to Alpha Cygni, abbreviated to Alpha Cyg or α Cyg.

Nomenclature

α Cygni (Latinised to Alpha Cygni) is the star's designation given by Johann Bayer in 1603. The traditional name Deneb is derived from the Arabic word for "tail", from the phrase ذنب الدجاجة Dhanab al-Dajājah, or "tail of the hen". The IAU Working Group on Star Names has recognised the name Deneb for this star, and it is entered in their Catalog of Star Names.

Denebadigege was used in the Alfonsine Tables, other variants include Deneb Adige, Denebedigege and Arided. This latter name was derived from Al Ridhādh, a name for the constellation. Johann Bayer called it Arrioph, derived from Aridf and Al Ridf, 'the hindmost'  or Gallina. German poet and author Philippus Caesius termed it Os rosae, or Rosemund in German, or Uropygium – the parson's nose. The names Arided and Aridif have fallen out of use.

An older traditional name is Arided , from the Arabic ar-ridf 'the one sitting behind the rider' (or just 'the follower'), perhaps referring to the other major stars of Cygnus, which were called al-fawāris 'the riders'.

Observation

The 19th brightest star in the night sky, Deneb culminates each year on October 23 at 6 PM and September 7 at 9 PM, corresponding to summer evenings in the northern hemisphere. It never dips below the horizon at or above 45° north latitude, just grazing the northern horizon at its lowest point at such locations as Minneapolis, Montréal and Turin. In the southern hemisphere, Deneb is not visible south of 45° parallel south, so it just barely rises above the horizon in South Africa, southern Australia, and northern New Zealand during the southern winter.

Deneb is located at the tip of the Northern Cross asterism made up of the brightest stars in Cygnus, the others being Albireo (Beta Cygni), Gamma Cygni, Delta Cygni, and Epsilon Cygni. It also lies at one vertex of the prominent and widely spaced asterism called the Summer Triangle, shared with the first-magnitude stars Vega in the constellation Lyra and Altair in Aquila. This outline of stars is the approximate shape of a right triangle, with Deneb located at one of the acute angles.

The spectra of Alpha Cygni has been observed by astronomers since at least 1888, and by 1910 the variable radial velocity had become apparent. This led to the early suggestion by E. B. Frost that this is a binary star system. In 1935, the work of G. F. Paddock and others had established that this star was variable in luminosity with a dominant period of 11.7 days and possibly with other, lower amplitude periods. By 1954, closer examination of the star's calcium H and K lines showed a stationary core, which indicated the variable velocity was instead being caused by motion of the star's atmosphere. This variation ranged from +6 to −9 km/s around the star's mean radial velocity. Other, similar supergiants were found to have variable velocities, with this star being a typical member.

Pole star
Due to the Earth's axial precession, Deneb will be an approximate pole star (7° off of the north celestial pole) at around 9800 AD. The north pole of Mars points to the midpoint of the line connecting Deneb and the star Alderamin.

Physical characteristics
This is derived by a variety of different methods, including spectral luminosity classes, atmospheric modelling, stellar evolution models, assumed membership of the Cygnus OB7 association, and direct measurement of angular diameter. These methods give different distances, and all have significant margins of error. The original derivation of a parallax using measurements from the astrometric satellite Hipparcos gave an uncertain result of 1.01 ± 0.57 mas that was consistent with this distance. However, a more recent reanalysis gives the much larger parallax whose distance is barely half the current accepted value. The controversy over whether the direct Hipparcos measurements can be ignored in favour of a wide range of indirect stellar models and interstellar distance scales is similar to the better known situation with the Pleiades.

Deneb is the most luminous first magnitude star, that is, stars with a brighter apparent magnitude than 1.5. Deneb is also the most distant of the 30 brightest stars by a factor of almost 2. Based on its temperature and luminosity, and also on direct measurements of its tiny angular diameter (a mere 0.002 seconds of arc), Deneb appears to have a diameter of about 200 times that of the Sun; if placed at the center of the Solar System, Deneb would extend out to the orbit of the Earth. It is one of the largest white 'A' spectral type stars known.

Deneb is a bluish-white star of spectral type A2Ia, with a surface temperature of 8,500 kelvin. Since 1943, its spectrum has served as one of the stable references by which other stars are classified. Its mass is estimated at 19 .

Evolutionary state
Stars in the mass range of Deneb eventually expand to become the most luminous red supergiants, and within a few million years their cores will collapse producing a supernova explosion. It is now known that red supergiants up to a certain mass explode as the commonly seen type II-P supernovae, but more massive ones lose their outer layers to become hotter again. Depending on their initial masses and the rate of mass loss, they may explode as yellow hypergiants or luminous blue variables, or they may become Wolf-Rayet stars before exploding in a type Ib or Ic supernova. Identifying whether Deneb is currently evolving towards a red supergiant or is currently evolving bluewards again would place valuable constraints on the classes of stars that explode as red supergiants and those that explode as hotter stars.

Stars evolving red-wards for the first time are most likely fusing hydrogen in a shell around a helium core that has not yet grown hot enough to start fusion to carbon and oxygen.  Convection has begun dredging up fusion products but these do not reach the surface. Post-red supergiant stars are expected to show those fusion products at the surface due to stronger convection during the red supergiant phase and due to loss of the obscuring outer layers of the star. Deneb is thought to be increasing its temperature after a period as a red supergiant, although current models do not exactly reproduce the surface elements showing in its spectrum.

Variable star

Deneb is the prototype of the Alpha Cygni (α Cygni) variable stars, whose small irregular amplitudes and rapid pulsations can cause its magnitude to vary anywhere between 1.21 and 1.29.  Its variable velocity discovered by Lee in 1910, but it was not formally placed as a unique class of variable stars until the 1985 4th edition of the General Catalogue of Variable Stars. The cause of the pulsations of Alpha Cygni variable stars are not fully understood, but their irregular nature seems to be due to beating of multiple pulsation periods. Analysis of radial velocities determined 16 different harmonic pulsation modes with periods ranging between 6.9 and 100.8 days. A longer period of about 800 days probably also exists.

Possible spectroscopic companion
Deneb has been reported as a possible single line spectroscopic binary with a period of about 850 days, where the spectral lines from the star suggest cyclical radial velocity changes. Later investigations have found no evidence supporting the existence of a companion.

Etymology and cultural significance
Names similar to Deneb have been given to at least seven different stars, most notably Deneb Kaitos, the brightest star in the constellation of Cetus; Deneb Algedi, the brightest star in Capricornus; and Denebola, the second brightest star in Leo. All these stars are referring to the tail of the animals that their respective constellations represent.

In the Chinese love story of Qi Xi, Deneb marks the magpie bridge across the Milky Way, which allows the separated lovers Niu Lang (Altair) and Zhi Nü (Vega) to be reunited on one special night of the year in late summer. In other versions of the story, Deneb is a fairy who acts as chaperone when the lovers meet.

Namesakes
USS Arided was a United States Navy Crater-class cargo ship named after the star. SS Deneb was an Italian merchant vessel that bore this name from 1951 until she was scrapped in 1966.

In fiction

The star Deneb, and hypothetical planets orbiting it, have been used many times in literature, film, electronic games, and music. Examples include several episodes of the Star Trek TV series, the Silver Surfer comic book, the Rush albums A Farewell to Kings and Hemispheres, the Descent: FreeSpace – The Great War computer game, Stellaris, and the science fiction novel Hyperion.

See also
 List of bright stars

References

A-type supergiants
Alpha Cygni variables
Emission-line stars

Northern pole stars
Cygnus (constellation)
Cygni, Alpha
BD+44 3541
Cygni, 50
197345
102098
7924
Stars named from the Arabic language
Arabic words and phrases